The bombing of the French consulate in West Berlin was a terrorist bomb attack targeting the Maison de France consulate on the Kurfürstendamm in West Berlin, West Germany on 25 August 1983. It killed one person and injured 23 others. The Armenian Secret Army for the Liberation of Armenia (ASALA) claimed responsibility in a telephone call and also took credit for a bomb at a French base in Beirut the same day, coming a month after the group's Orly Airport attack. The group commented "We will continue our struggle until the liberation of innocent Armenians from French jails." However the attack was actually orchestrated by Ilich Ramírez Sánchez, better known as Carlos the Jackal, who had relations with the ASALA's leadership. Carlos claimed responsibility in a letter written to the German Embassy in Saudi Arabia.

The bomb, containing 20 to 30 kg of explosives, was planted in a storage room on the building's fourth floor by Ahmed Mustafa El-Sibai, a Lebanese man and associate of Carlos. The blast tore the building's roof, destroyed the fourth floor and caused part of it to collapse, causing a total of 2.5 million marks in damage. The explosives were brought into East Berlin by Johannes Weinrich, another close aide to Carlos. Weinrich had brought the explosives in a year prior, they had been confiscated by the Stasi secret police, then returned just prior to the bombing by East German major (later lieutenant colonel/oberstleutnant) Helmut Voigt who passed the explosives back to Weinrich at the Syrian Embassy, which was Carlos's base in East Germany. Weinrich successfully transported the explosives from East to West Berlin via the Friedrichstraße before giving them to El-Sibai who planted it.

The fatal victim was 26-year-old Michael Haritz, a peace activist who was handing out leaflets at the consulate protesting France's nuclear weapons testing in the South Pacific, and died from asphyxiation.

Carlos previously bombed several targets in France, including the 1982 Capitole train bombing. He said the attacks in France and West Berlin were in revenge for French air strikes against a Popular Front for the Liberation of Palestine training camp in Lebanon.

Aftermath and convictions
The Maison de France is a French cultural centre featuring a French book shop, grocery store, cinema and restaurant. It was rebuilt after the attack and opened by Helmut Kohl and François Mitterrand in 1985.

On 26 March, 1991, approximately six months after the two Germanies officially reunified, Voigt fled to Greece. Voigt had heard in news broadcasts of the planned arrests of Stasi employees who had supported terrorist actions in West Germany as part of their East-German Stasi work. Voigt lived in the Greek port city of Volos under a false identity, but was found and arrested in 1991, when his wife visited him, carrying a tracking device that had been planted in her luggage by West German investigators without her knowledge. Voigt was extradited, tried, and found guilty in April 1994 for his role in the bombing, and was sentenced to four years in prison. 

In 1995, after years of searching, Weinrich was detained in Yemen and flown back to Germany.  In 2000, after a four year trial, Weinrich was found guilty and given a life sentence. Nabil Shritah, the Syrian diplomat who stored the explosives at the embassy, was given a two year sentence.

See also
1981 Turkish consulate attack in Paris

References

1983 in international relations
1983 in West Germany
1980s in West Berlin
1983 murders in Germany
Armenian Secret Army for the Liberation of Armenia
Attacks on buildings and structures in Berlin
Attacks on diplomatic missions of France
August 1983 crimes
August 1983 events in Europe
Explosions in Berlin
Improvised explosive device bombings in 1983 
Murder in Berlin
Terrorist attacks attributed to Armenian militant groups
Terrorist incidents in Berlin
Terrorist incidents in Germany in 1983
French consulate in West Berlin
1980s murders in Berlin
de:Maison de France